Keast may refer to:

 Keast's tube-nosed fruit bat
 Keast Park, a park in Seaford, Victoria, Australia

People with the surname
 Jackie Keast, editor of If Magazine, an Australian film industry magazine
 James Allen Keast (1922–2009), Australian ornithologist
 William Keast (New South Wales politician) (1872–1938), member of the New South Wales Legislative Assembly 
 William Keast (Victorian politician) (1866–1927), member of the Victorian Legislative Assembly

See also
 Keaster, a slang term for buttocks
 Keats (disambiguation)